Wilpert is a German surname. Notable people with the surname include:

Bernhard Wilpert (1936–2007), German psychologist
Gero von Wilpert (1933–2009), Baltic German literary scientist
Günter Wilpert (1933–2006), German music pedagogue, trumpetist and composer
Joseph Wilpert (1857−1944), German Christian archeologist
Marni von Wilpert, American politician

German-language surnames